Luke Quigley (born 20 July 1981) is an Australian former professional rugby league footballer who played as a  for the Newcastle Knights in the National Rugby League (NRL) and the Catalans Dragons in the Super League.

Background
Quigley went to school at St Gregory's College, Campbelltown.

Playing career
Quigley made his first grade debut for Newcastle against the Wests Tigers in Round 15 2002. In 2003, Quigley made 21 appearances as Newcastle reached the finals but were eliminated by the Sydney Roosters.

In 2005, Quigley made 16 appearances as Newcastle finished last claiming the wooden spoon.  Quigley's final game in the NRL came in 2006 in a 50–6 loss against Brisbane in the elimination semi final. 

In 2007, Quigley joined the Catalans Dragons and played one season with the club. In March 2007 he was signed to French Super League club Catalans Dragons to replace the injured Aaron Gorrell.

Quigley last played in the Newcastle Rugby League for the Kurri Kurri Bulldogs.

References

1981 births
Living people
Australian rugby league players
Catalans Dragons players
Kurri Kurri Bulldogs players
Newcastle Knights players
Rugby league hookers
Rugby league players from Dubbo